The Rampage from Exile Tribe (Japanese: ザ・ランページ・フロム・エグザイル・トライブ, stylized as THE RAMPAGE from EXILE TRIBE and also known as The Rampage), is a  J-pop vocal and dance group formed and managed by talent agency LDH and signed to Avex's record label Rhythm Zone. The Rampage is part of the collective supergroup, Exile Tribe and is composed of sixteen members. The group was formed in 2014 and the members were chosen from Exile's Vocal Battle Audition 4, Exile Performer Battle Audition and Global Japan Challenge auditions. The Rampage made their debut in January 2017 with the release of their first single "Lightning".

History

2014–2016: Pre-debut 
On April 11, 2014, Exile Hiro announced on the TV show Sukkiri!! a new group being formed for Exile Tribe.

On September 12, 2014, the final sixteen members of The Rampage were recruited from participants of "Exile Performer Battle Audition", a competition to be part of EXILE, "Vocal Battle Audition 4", a competition for young people who dream of being vocalists, and "Global Japan Challenge", a program for young people who dream of performing internationally and form a dance and vocal group. The name of the group, "The Rampage (run about wildly)" shows that the group would always dance wildly and passionately on stage. Before debuting, they went on their Musha Shugyo, touring the country for 2 years as part of their training. They performed for free in various places in Japan. Through these performances, they bonded as a group, improved as performers and gained fans. As part of their Musha Shugyo, the group also participated in Exile Tribe's "Exile Tribe Perfect Year Live Tour Tower of Wish 2014 ~The Revolution~" dome tours. In their final year of Musha Shugyo, the group split up into 3 separate teams to promote and improve themselves more individually.

Prior to their debut, the members of the group (specifically the performers) also participated in tours from other LDH artists as support members, such as Exile The Second's tour Exile the Second Live Tour 2016–2017 "Wild Wild Warriors".

On September 27, 2016, it was revealed the group would make their major debut with their first single in early 2017.

2017: Debut with "Lightning" and first tour 
The Rampage debuted on January 25, 2017, with their first single "Lightning" peaking at #2 on the Oricon Weekly Charts and being certified 'Gold' by the RIAJ for selling 100,000 physical copies. The group received their first major award in the MTV Video Music Awards Japan for their "Lightning" music video.

In the following months of April and July The Rampage released their second and third single "Frontiers" and 'Dirty Disco' which peaked at #3 and #5 respectively.

In early November, The Rampage released their fourth single '100degrees'. The single reached #6 in the Oricon Weekly Charts and earned the group the 'New Wave Artist Award' at the Asia Artist Awards where they performed for the first time overseas. Later in December The Rampage embarked on their first tour ever The Rampage Live Tour 2017-2018 "Go on the Rampage" starting in December and ending in March 2018.

2018: Final dates of their first tour, singles and first album The Rampage 
On April 25, 2018, the group released their 5th single "Fandango", followed by their 6th single "Hard Hit" on July 18. On August 13, 14, 16 and 17 the group held the final dates of their first tour, which were titled The Rampage Live Tour 2017–2018 "Go on the Rampage" The Final.

On September 12, 2018, the group released their first album The Rampage. On the same day, their second tour and first arena tour named The Rampage Live Tour 2019 "Throw Ya Fist" that would go through 2019 was announced.

2019: Second tour, Battle of Tokyo and second album The Riot
The group's 7th single "Throw Ya Fist" was released on January 30, 2019, as the kickoff single for their next tour. The single also included "Down By Law" as a B-side track, which acted the opening theme song for the anime Fairy Tail and was the group's first anime opening since their debut. From February 6 to May 26, the group went on their second tour The Rampage Live Tour 2019 "Throw Ya Fist", which was also their first arena tour in Japan.

In June 2019, the Battle of Tokyo project started, which includes all Jr.Exile groups. During this month those 4 groups released collaboration singles every week, until they released a full album titled "Battle of Tokyo 〜Enter the Jr.Exile〜" on July 3, 2019. Accompanying the album release, the groups held a row of live performances from July 4 to 7 with the same name.

On July 31, the group released their 8th single "Welcome 2 Paradise", with a music video shot at Paradise City in South Korea. The single included "Nobody" as a B-side track, being the group's first original English song.

On August 8, it was announced that the group would release their 9th single "Swag & Pride" on October 2, which is also used in the TV drama High&Low the Worst Episode.O. and the movie HighLow: The Worst. Shortly after on August 19, The Rampage announced their second album to be released on October 30. The CD/2DVD and CD/2Blu-ray versions would also include live footage of The Rampage Live Tour 2019 "Throw Ya Fist" concert at Saitama Super Arena.

On September 10, nearly one year after the release of their first album, it was announced that the title of their second album would be The Riot. Two days later an event called The Rampage from Exile Tribe 5th Anniversary Special Event was held, celebrating five years since the group's formation. Shortly after, the group attended the High&Low The Worst vs The Rampage from Exile Tribe Premium Live Show, a live event featuring the cast of the upcoming movie which gathered an audience of about 50 thousand people over two days. Due to the success of this event, a similar live show was held at Yokohama Arena with Doberman Infinity as a surprise guest on December 26. On October 10, the group released the music video for the title track "Move The World" to promote their new album.

About a month after the release of the group's second album on October 30, it was announced that The Rampage would release their 10th single "Full Metal Trigger" on January 15, 2020. The single would also serve as the theme song of The Rampage Live Tour 2020 "RMPG" and include the full live footage of the group's first appearance at a-nation on August 18, 2019.

On December 8, it was revealed that The Rampage and Fantastics would be in charge of the special movie theme songs for the 40th anniversary project of Mobile Suit Gundam titled Gundam × KenOkuyama Design × LDH Japan “G40 Project”. The Rampage's theme song "SHOW YOU THE WAY" and Fantastics' theme song "To the Sky" would both reflect the story of Mobile Suit Gundam from two different aspects. The full special movie project was released on Gundam's official YouTube channel on January 1, 2020.

2020: Third tour, Ma55ive the Rampage and Live×Online 
After the release of their 10th single "Full Metal Trigger" on January 15, the group started their third tour The Rampage Live Tour 2020 "RMPG" on February 5, 2020, and planned to conclude it on May 10. On the second day of their tour, the group's sub-unit Ma55ive the Rampage released their first official digital song titled "Determined". This sub-unit had been introduced during their first tour The Rampage Live Tour 2017-2018 "Go on the Rampage" for the first time and consists of the 5 members Likiya, Kenta, Yamasho, Shohei and Takahide. Furthermore, they released their 11th single "Invisible Love" on April 22, which marked the first time they would have a slow-tempo song as a title track.

Due to the consequences of the COVID-19 pandemic in 2020, several concerts of The Rampage's third tour had to be cancelled or postponed. As a reparation, the group held a live event with no audience that was streamed on the Japanese video service niconico (Nico Nico Douga) on March 24, 2020. A total of over 280 thousand viewers watched the broadcast which lasted about 1 hour and 45 minutes. Furthermore, the group held a series of livestreamed concerts on the Japanese streaming platform AbemaTV from July to December. Live×Online "The Rampage" was held on July 8, and Live×Online Imagination "The Rampage" was held on September 19. On October 30, they participated on Live×Online Infinity "Trick or Treat!! R.F.B. Halloween Party!!", and finally Live×Online Beyond the Border on December 22.

On September 30, the group released their 12th single titled "Fears" which served as the theme song for Fuji TV drama "Terror Newspaper". On December 9, the group released their 13th single and last of the year titled "My Prayer", it acted as the theme song for  Abema TV's "Koi Suru Shuumatsu Homestay".

On December 31, the group took part in the livestreamed concert of LDH artists, Live×Online Countdown 2020▶2021"Rising Sun to the World".

2021: Reboot 
On February 24, the group released their third studio album Reboot which includes all their songs starting from 2020 plus the album's promotional track "Silver Rain" which was pre-released digitally on February 1.

On April 18, a new album by Jr.Exile for the Battle of Tokyo project titled "Battle of Tokyo Time 4 Jr.Exile" was announced to be released on June 23, the songs by the individual groups and the collaboration song of Generations & The Rampage were pre-released digitally from April 19 to June 21, the music videos were released in a hybrid live-action/animated form, with this latter featuring the four groups' avatars. Moreover, the DVD Version included the concert video of "Battle Of Tokyo ~Enter The Jr.Exile~" held in Makuhari Messe in July 2019.

On June 30, the group released their 14th single "Heatwave", two songs from the single were pre-released digitally ahead of the single's release: "Your Life Your Game" which was used as a tie-in for Morinaga's Ice Box Web CM on April 7, and "All about Tonight" which served as the opening of the group's variety show Run! Run! Rampage‼︎ on May 3.

On October 27, the group released their 15th single "Living In The Dream", the b-sides included three songs which were all pre-released digitally: "Moon and Back" as the main theme song and "Stampede" as the insert song of the stage play Real RPG Stage "Eternal" which stars several of the group's members, plus "Off The Wall" which acted as the ending theme of the TV drama Tokyo Seimenjo which stars Hokuto Yoshino.

On December 1, the group released the tribute single "The Rampage from Exile" as a part of Exile's 20th anniversary celebration project "Exile Tribute", the single is the first of the four consecutive tribute singles releases by Jr.Exile groups.

2022: Ray of Light 
On January 25, the group released their fourth studio album titled Ray of Light, it included all their songs from 2021 plus the album's promotional track Ray Of Light with 13 songs in total.

Side projects

Ma55ive the Rampage 
The first sub-unit established from The Rampage is Ma55ive the Rampage which consists of the 5 performers Likiya, Kenta, Yamasho, Shohei and Takahide. The unit focuses on Hip-Hop and features Likiya, Yamasho, Shohei and Takahide as rappers while Kenta acts as a vocalist. This is the first time those members provide vocals to any The Rampage work. The quintet was introduced during The Rampage's first tour The Rampage Live Tour 2017-2018 "Go on the Rampage" and made their official debut with the digital song "Determined" on February 6, 2020.

On May 27, 2020, the unit was scheduled to perform as opening act of the Exile Shokichi vs CrazyBoy "King & King" concert at Yokohama Arena in a battle with the rappers of Ballistik Boyz, but on April 8, the concert was cancelled.

On December 2, 2020, the unit released their second digital single "No.1".

On July 17, 2021, the unit released their third digital single "Drip Drop".

Members

Discography

Albums

Singles

As featured artists

Filmography

Awards

Notes

References

Avex Group artists
Japanese pop music groups
Musical groups established in 2017
Musical groups from Tokyo
Japanese boy bands
LDH (company) artists
2017 establishments in Japan